The Kalamaia are an Aboriginal Australian people of the Wheatbelt and Goldfields-Esperance regions of Western Australia.

Country
Their eastward extension ran to Bullabulling, while the northern boundaries lay around Youanmi, Lake Barlee, and Pigeon Rocks. To the west, their frontier was in the areas covered by Burracoppin, Mukinbudin, Kalannie, and Lake Moore. Their southern flank went to Mount Holland in the Parker Range. A term Jawan is applied to northwestern portions of tribe from. These lands included places like Boorabbin and Southern Cross.

Social organization and customs
The Kalamaia figure in the forefront of those tribes that included circumcision in their initiation ceremonies, and the called contiguous southwestern tribes which did not share this rite Mudia/Mudila/Mudilja, a pejorative word referring to their physical states. Another term for such Mudiya was Minang ((people of the) south).
Daisy Bate's also refers to the tribes that occupied  southern cross as Eastern Meenung with their territory ending near Boorabbin.

Alternative names
 Ka'la:mai, Kalamaya, Kalamai
 Kaprun
 Jungaa (meaning "men")
 Jungal
 Yungar, Youngar, Youngal
 Takalako (Njakinjaki exonym)
 Njindango
 Natingero
 Jawan (term used of Kalamaia clans north of Mukinbudin)
 Jaburu ("north")
 Yabro

Notes

Citations

Sources

Aboriginal peoples of Western Australia
Goldfields-Esperance